Ben Dawkins is an Australian politician who is a member of the Western Australian Legislative Council. He succeeded Alannah MacTiernan as a member for the South West Region.

Early life
Dawkins was a lawyer from Narrogin, Western Australia, before becoming a politician.

Political career
Dawkins was fifth placed on Labor's South West Region ticket at the 2021 Western Australian state election. The first three candidates on Labor's ticket were elected. Alannah MacTiernan resigned on 10 February 2023 opening up a spot in the South West Region. Bunbury sign-writer John Mondy, the fourth-placed candidate, chose not to take the seat as he was preoccupied with his business. Therefore, the seat went to Dawkins. Prior to taking his seat, Dawkins was suspended from the Labor Party for being charged with 43 counts of breaching a violence restraining order. He pleaded guilty to the charges on 17 February 2023. Despite that, he was appointed to the Legislative Council on 20 March 2023.

References

Living people
Members of the Western Australian Legislative Council
21st-century Australian politicians
21st-century Australian lawyers
Western Australian lawyers